The 1996 Southwest Conference baseball tournament was the league's annual postseason tournament used to determine the Southwest Conference's (SWC) automatic bid to the 1996 NCAA Division I baseball tournament. The tournament was held from May 15 through 18 at Dan Law Field on the campus of Texas Tech University in Lubbock, Texas, and drew a total attendance of 31,542. This was the first time the SWC tournament was held in Lubbock, and the final conference tournament before the conference disbanded.

The sixth-seeded Rice Owls went undefeated to win the team's first SWC tournament under fifth-season head coach Wayne Graham.

Format and seeding 
The 1996 SWC tournament was the first, and only, to feature all teams in a double-elimination tournament over four rounds.

The SWC regular season champion, Texas Longhorns, received the tournament's only first-round bye while the remaining six teams were seeded based on their regular season conference standings. TCU claimed the fourth seed by tiebreaker over Baylor, while Rice earned the sixth seed over Houston by tiebreaker.

Tournament

References 

Tournament
Baseball in Lubbock, Texas
Southwest Conference Baseball Tournament
Southwest Conference baseball tournament
Events in Lubbock, Texas
Sports competitions in Texas